Young & Thuggin is the debut album by New Orleans rapper Turk, released on June 5, 2001 through Cash Money Records, and produced entirely by Mannie Fresh. The album was a success on the charts, selling 82,000 copies in its first week, peaking at #9 on the Billboard 200 and #2 on the Top R&B/Hip-Hop Albums. Among the guests featured on the album were his fellow Hot Boys, the Big Tymers and Mack 10.

Track listing
"Intro"- 1:52  (feat. Mannie Fresh)
"Bout To Go Down"- 4:45 (feat. Baby & Christina)
"It's In Me"- 4:14
"Yes We Do"- 5:22 (feat. Lil Wayne, B.G., Lac & Mack 10)
"At The Same Time"- 4:20
"Growing Up"- 4:14 (feat. Mickey & Christina)
"Hatin' (Skit)"- 1:08 (feat. Mannie Fresh)
"Untamed Guerrilla"- 4:03
"Public Service Announcement"- 1:30 (feat. Mannie Fresh)
"One Saturday Night"- 5:14 (feat. Lil Derrick & Mannie Fresh)
"What Would You Do?"- 4:23
"Project"-  4:14 (feat. Hakeem)
"Seattle Slew (Skit)"- 1:22 (feat. Mac Minister)
"Freak Da Hoes"- 4:51 (feat. Mannie Fresh)
"Police (Skit)"- :22 (feat. Mac Minister)
"Soldierette"- 4:18 (feat. Stone)
"All Night"- 3:36 (feat. Lil Wayne)
"Finna Records"- 2:08 (feat. Mannie Fresh)
"Wanna Be Down"- 4:07 (feat. Baby, Hakeem, & Lac)
"Trife Livin'"- 4:12
"Hallways & Cuts"- 4:07 (feat. Mickey & B.G.)

Charts

Weekly charts

Year-end charts

References

2001 debut albums
Cash Money Records albums
Turk (rapper) albums